North Philadelphia/West is a neighborhood in the western central part of the North Philadelphia section of Philadelphia east of the Schuylkill River.

North Philadelphia/West is the section of North Philadelphia located west of North Broad St. It is bordered by Poplar St and West Girard Ave in the south, West Lehigh Ave in the north and Ridge Ave in the west. North Philadelphia/West is bordered by the neighborhoods of North Philadelphia/East, Fairmount, Parkland and Allegheny West. North Central, Philadelphia is east of North Philadelphia West.

A district office plan was proposed as a possible upcoming major development.

The neighborhood's zip codes are 19121, 19129, 19130 and 19132.

Demographics
In March 2018, the section had a 20.95% unemployment rate with 45.96% living in poverty.

References 

Neighborhoods in Philadelphia
North Philadelphia